The Spanish ironclad Vitoria was an iron-hulled armored frigate purchased from England during the 1860s. The ship participated on both sides during the Cantonal rebellion of 1873–1874, first on the rebel side and then after her crew surrendered to neutral warships, on the government side. She played a major role in the Battle off Cartagena for the government. Vitoria bombarded rebel towns from 1874 to 1876 during the Third Carlist War. The ship was reconstructed in the late 1890s and reclassified as a coast-defense ship, although she served as a training ship until she was scrapped in 1912.

Design and description

She displaced . Her crew consisted of 561 officers and enlisted men.

The ship was fitted with a John Penn and Sons trunk steam engine that drove the single propeller shaft using steam provided by eight boilers.

The frigate's main battery was originally intended to consist of thirty 68-pounder gun smoothbore guns mounted on the broadside, but she was fitted with four Armstrong  and three Armstrong  rifled muzzle-loading guns, and fourteen Trubia  smoothbore guns. The nine-inch and 160-millimeter guns were situated on the gun deck while the eight-inch guns were positioned on the main deck, one on each broadside, and another in the forecastle as the forward chase gun. By 1883, the Trubia guns had been replaced by four more nine-inch guns. When Vitoria was refitted in France in 1896–1898, her armament was changed to six Hontoria 160 mm and eight Canet  rifled breech-loading guns and a pair of  torpedo tubes.

Vitoria had a complete wrought iron  waterline belt of 140 mm armor plates. The ends of the ship and the deck were unarmored.

Construction and career
Named after the 1813 victory at the Battle of Vitoria during the Napoleonic Wars, Vitoria was ordered from the Thames Iron Works in December 1862 and was laid down at their shipyard in Blackwall, London, the following month. The ship was launched on 4 November 1865, completed in May 1867 and commissioned in February 1868. 

Vitoria participated in the Cantonal rebellion, initially on the side of the rebels. Shortly after the Cantonists seized Cartagena and all the Spanish Navy's ships there, Vitoria and the armed steamer Vigilante sailed to Alicante and persuaded the city government to join the rebels. That lasted only until their departure later that same day. The uprising prompted an intervention by Britain and Germany, both of which contributed to an international squadron. Vitoria and the frigate  attempted to extort the port of Almería; the German commander, Reinhold von Werner, learned of the incident and sent his flagship, the armored frigate  and the British ironclad  to intervene. The two ironclads attacked Vitoria and Almansa, overwhelming them in a brief engagement and forcing their surrender. Werner then turned over the two Spanish ships to Vice Admiral Hastings Yelverton, who in turn sent them to the British port at Gibraltar. Both vessels were then returned to the Spanish government, which put them back into service. Vitoria became the flagship of the Spanish commander, Admiral Lobo.

Vitoria took part in the Battle off Cartagena against rebel vessels on 11 October. She was at that time enforcing a blockade of Cartagena, and several rebel vessels sortied in an attempt to break the blockade. Vitoria engaged the rebel flagship, the ironclad , at close range before the latter turned and fled to port. Vitoria then turned her attention to the casemate ship , which also turned to flee. Vitorias pursuit was blocked by the arrival of the French ironclad . Vitoria then engaged the third rebel ironclad, exchanging broadsides at close range, though neither vessel was seriously damaged in the encounter. The rebel attempt to break through the blockade ended in failure. Two days later, they again put to sea, but Lobo declined to engage and instead took Vitoria off to the east.

On 1 January 1874, Vitoria fired at the British steamship Ellen Constance as she was leaving Cartagena. Although Ellen Constance hove to, she was rammed and sunk by Vitoria with the loss of three of her crew. The collision was blamed on poor seamanship by the Spanish sailors and not thought to be a deliberate act. 

As Cartagena was in the process of surrendering, Numanica evaded the blockading force on the night of 12 January and sought refuge in the port of Oran, in French North Africa the following day. Pursued by Vitoria and a wooden steamer, the French turned over control of the rebel ship to Rear Admiral Nicolas Chicarro, commander of the government ships, on 18 January. Vitoria and the monitor  bombarded various rebel-controlled towns during the later stages of the Third Carlist War of 1872–1876.

During Vitorias reconstruction as a central-battery ironclad by Forges et Chantiers de la Méditerranée at its La Seyne-sur-Mer shipyard in 1896–1898, her sailing rig was replaced by a pair of pole masts. She was reclassified as a coast-defense ship in 1899 and served as a training ship until she was broken up in 1912.

Footnotes

References
 
 
 

 

1865 ships
Ironclad warships of the Spanish Navy
Ships built in Leamouth
Cantonalism in Spain